Hoe Street Ward is a political division of the London Borough of Waltham Forest and is one of the eight wards of the Walthamstow constituency represented by Stella Creasy MP. The population of the ward at the 2011 Census was 13,912.

The ward is represented by three councillors with elections every four years. The councillors elected in the 2018 election were:
 Saima Mahmud (Labour)
 Tom Connor (Labour)
 Ahsan Khan (Labour)

External links

References

Wards of the London Borough of Waltham Forest